Nate David Smith (born August 28, 1991) is an American former professional baseball pitcher.

Career
After graduating from Lakota West High School, Smith played college baseball at Furman University. He was drafted by the Los Angeles Angels of Anaheim in the eighth round of the 2013 Major League Baseball draft.

Smith signed with the Angels and made his professional debut with the Orem Owlz. He spent the whole season there, going 2–2 with a 3.86 ERA in 35 innings. He started 2014 with the Inland Empire 66ers and was later promoted to the Arkansas Travelers. In 21 starts between the two teams, he compiled an 11–6 record and 2.97 ERA. After the season, he played for the Mesa Solar Sox in the Arizona Fall League.

In 2015, Smith played for Arkansas and the Salt Lake Bees where he posted a 10–8 record and 3.86 ERA in 24 starts. In July 2015, he pitched for Team USA at the 2015 Pan American Games.

In 2016, he pitched for Salt Lakes where he was 8–9 with a 4.61 ERA in 26 starts. The Angels added him to their 40-man roster after the 2016 season.

Smith played in only four games in 2017 due to injury. Smith missed all of 2018 due to anterior capsule surgery.

He was released on May 3, 2019.

References

External links

Furman Paladins bio

1994 births
Living people
Arizona League Angels players
Arkansas Travelers players
Baseball pitchers
Baseball players at the 2015 Pan American Games
Baseball players from Ohio
Furman Paladins baseball players
Inland Empire 66ers of San Bernardino players
Mesa Solar Sox players
Orem Owlz players
Pan American Games medalists in baseball
Pan American Games silver medalists for the United States
People from West Chester, Butler County, Ohio
Salt Lake Bees players
United States national baseball team players
Medalists at the 2015 Pan American Games